Anderton with Marbury is a civil parish in the unitary authority of Cheshire West and Chester and the ceremonial county of Cheshire, England.  It had a population of 582 according to the 2001 census, reducing slightly to 571 at the 2011 Census, and includes the villages of Anderton and Marbury. The eastern part of the parish lies in the Northwich Community Woodlands which includes Marbury Country Park, situated in the grounds of the old Marbury Hall, and Anderton Nature Park.

Anderton is known for the Victorian Anderton Boat Lift, which was the model for other European boat lifts.  It is fully restored and raises boats  from the River Weaver to the Trent and Mersey Canal.

See also

Listed buildings in Anderton with Marbury

Further reading
 Christine Hamlett, Jackie Hamlett; A House with Spirit: Dedication to Marbury Hall; Leonie Press (Feb 1998); 
 Photographs of Marbury Hall, Cheshire, England, UK
 Marbury: 1850 and 1892
 Marbury Country Park
 Anderton Boat Lift

References

Civil parishes in Cheshire